The Disruption of American Democracy is a book published by American historian Roy Franklin Nichols in 1948, which won the 1949 Pulitzer Prize for History.

In the book, Nichols argued that the American Civil War was not fundamentally the product of underlying social and economic forces. Instead, he blames the machinations of "vote-hungry" politicians who calibrated their appeals in a culturally diverse society, which was speedily growing, so as to encourage regional and cultural groups to pursue objectives that led to the breakdown of the Union, something that most didn't seek or foresee.

 online edition at archive.org

References

1948 non-fiction books
Pulitzer Prize for History-winning works
History books about the American Civil War
Books about democracy
Macmillan Publishers books